Walter Garth Butler (7 February 1923 – 13 July 1995) was an English footballer. He was nicknamed "the assassin" for his habit of taking several different coloured pills before a match.

Career
Butler joined Port Vale from Derby County in June 1946. He played 12 Third Division South games in the 1946–47 season and featured in 39 league and one FA Cup game in the 1947–48 campaign. He continued to be a key part of manager Gordon Hodgson's first team plans, and played 34 games in the 1948–49 season and made 43 appearances in the 1949–50 campaign. He featured just five times for the "Valiants" in the 1950–51 season, and was forced to retire from professional football in October 1951 after proving unable to recover from a knee injury. He had played 134 league and cup games during his five years at The Old Recreation Ground / Vale Park.

Career statistics
Source:

References

1923 births
1995 deaths
Footballers from Birmingham, West Midlands
English footballers
Association football fullbacks
Derby County F.C. players
Port Vale F.C. players
English Football League players